Go Yoon-hwan (born August 26, 1998), better known by his stage name Ryeoun, is a South Korean actor. He is best known for his roles in 18 Again (2020), The World of My 17 (2020) and Adult Trainee (2021).

Filmography

Television series

Web series

Television shows

Music videos appearances

Awards and nominations

References

External links

 Ryeoun at Lucky Company

1998 births
Living people
South Korean male television actors
21st-century South Korean male actors
South Korean male web series actors
Hanlim Multi Art School alumni